Central Railway Building (CRB) is situated in the scenic hilly area of Chittagong, Bangladesh. It is the governing office for the general manager of Bangladesh Railway. The building was completed in 1872, it is one of the oldest buildings of the port city. To the east, across CRB Road, is Railway Hospital at CRB, built in 1994. There is a proposal to establish a 50-bed medical college at CRB and up-grade the existing Railway Hospital to 250 beds. There is a residential area for the railway officers surrounding it.

In popular culture

Pohela Boishakh celebration

Pohela Boishakh or Bengali New Year celebrated every year on the open stage called "Shireeshtala" at CRB area. This open stage surrounded by several old Albizia lebbeck trees, in Bengali it is called Shireesh.

Boli Khela a type of free hand wrestling, is organised every year at this place during the Bangla New Year festival. At the festival it is the centre of attraction for people of all ages.

Gallery

References

Further reading
Mahbabul Haque Chittagong guide: tourist, industrial, shipping & business guide Barnarekha 1981
Nazimuddin Ahmad Buildings of the British Raj in Bangladesh University Press 1986

External links

Buildings and structures in Chittagong
Ministry of Railways (Bangladesh)
Transport in Chittagong
Railway buildings and structures